The Jazz Fest Sarajevo (Bosnian, Croatian and Serbian: Sarajevski džez festival / Сарајевски џез фестивал) is an international music festival held annually during the first week of November in Sarajevo and is the largest of its kind in Southeastern Europe.

The Jazz Fest Sarajevo is an annual celebration of contemporary music based on jazz and improvised music, and it has been a regular attraction since 1997. The week-long event presents jazz musicians from 60 countries in over 300 concerts.

Background 
"After all the huge amount of music and emotion experienced in Sarajevo, what is left is the sense of having lived through an intellectual adventure of the highest caliber. Kudos to Edin and his team for creating and keeping alive this festival in the most difficult conditions – we all may soon have to learn from them." –Francesco Martinelli for All About Jazz, November 2016.

"Almost 21 years after the Dayton agreement Jazz Fest has managed to organize 20 festivals! Edin Zubčević and his staff not only deserve a culture prize but also the Nobel peace prize!" –Lars Mossefinn for salt-peanuts*, November 2016.

Jazz Fest Sarajevo is an annual celebration of contemporary music based on jazz-related and improvised music. The festival program features well-known musicians from around the world, but also invites new and prospective artists for performances in several venues around the city. In the past 20 years it has earned a reputation of a trend setting international music festival in the Balkan region, with more than 770 artists, who have presented more than 270 different ensembles to audiences.

Within its program, dedicated to offering audiences a relevant cross section of contemporary music, Jazz Fest has presented top artists in their field, rising stars and local talents every year anew, including many premieres. At its 20th-anniversary edition in 2016, it presented yet another European premiere – John Zorn's Bagatelles Marathon, presenting 11 ensembles with a stellar line up of Zorn's longtime collaborators from New York's downtown scene.

With a growing local and international fan community which appreciates the festival's high production standards, diverse and adventurous programming and educational content for kids, young musicians and music students, Jazz Fest Sarajevo has become one of the most important musical events in the country, as well as an event of high cultural significance for its society.

Jazz Fest Sarajevo is a member of Europe Jazz Network – the European family of organizers of artistic musical programs.

Live releases recorded at Jazz Fest Sarajevo 
Live in Sarajevo by Norwegian saxophonist, tenor and composer Håkon Kornstad is a recording of his solo performance held at 18th Jazz Fest Sarajevo 2014, released by Jazzland Recordings in 2015.

The composition "Adhān" by Arve Henriksen from his album Places of Worship, released by Runne Grammofon in 2013, is a field recording from his performance at 2nd Xenophonia in 2010.

Live! by Bosnian vocalist Amira Medunjnanin was recorded in 2008 at 12th Jazz Fest Sarajevo and released by Gramofon the following year.

Very Much Alive by Norwegian drummer Paolo Vinaccia, released by Jazzland Recordings in 2010, features a concert of the Terje Rypdal Trio held at 6th Jazz Fest Sarajevo 2002.

Concert links 
The John Scofield Überjam Band concert at 17th Jazz Fest Sarajevo 2013

Eivind Aarset Quartet concert at 17th Jazz Fest Sarajevo 2013

David Gilmore & Art of Ascension Trio concert at 17th Jazz Fest Sarajevo 2013

Dhafer Youssef performing Odd Poetry and Aya1984 at 10th Jazz Fest Sarajevo 2006

Related events 
Kid's Day is held traditionally on a Sunday, always the last festival day, when kids of age 3 to 12 have the chance to enjoy a concert with a repertoire of jazz standards rearranged especially for the occasion, followed by a workshop, "Meet the Instruments", where they prove, every year anew, that free chocolate and natural juices are the best fuel for uncontrolled music making.

Music Meeting Sarajevo is an educational program for young musicians and music students from the Western Balkans region held within the festival program, offering its participants an opportunity to meet the festival's artists as well as a chance to perform within its Late Nite Stage program at jam sessions, while at the same time functioning as a successful platform for future collaborations among young musicians, who usually get only few chances to participate in similar events in a society marked by the Balkan wars in the 1990s.

Xenophonia was initiated by Jazz Fest Sarajevo as a platform for collaboration between local and international artists, with the aim to enable a way for Bosnian and Herzegovenian musicians to position themselves on the international music scene.

Visuals 
In collaboration with numerous local designers, Jazz Fest Sarajevo has created a visual path of its own in the past two decades.

Its posters have become collectors' items, earning JFS and its design partners many accolades, among them a Web Award in 2011, for best web site national in the field of culture and the Grand Prix Web of the Year Award.

The famous, mouthless Green Man made an unforgettable impression on the posters of the 7th, 8th and 9th Jazz Fest Sarajevo in 2003, 2004 and 2005 and was proclaimed Jazz Fest Sarajevo's mascot by audiences who kept looking for it at festival editions that followed.

The Norwegian light designer VJ Tord Knudsen repeatedly ensured a visual spectacle at multiple festival editions, making Jazz Fest Sarajevo concerts a full artistic experience for its audiences.

Personnel 
Edin Zubčević – founder and artistic director

Djana Karavdić – head of office

Eric Bajramović – head of production

Mina Maglić – box office and assistance

Including a small but prolific community of loyal Jazz Fest Sarajevo freelance experts and collaborators, who help to make each festival a memorable experience for everyone involved.

Past programs

References 

"Sarajevo Jazz Festival 2016" Francesco Martinelli. All About Jazz. USA. November 18, 2016.

"The Times They Are A-Changin, Lars Mossefin. salt-peanuts*. Norway. November 7, 2016.

"Re-creation: Jazz as a tool for social cohesion Jazz Fest Sarajevo/Banlieus Bleus" Fiona Goh. Strength in numbers 2, A study by Europe Jazz Network. 2016.

External links 
 Website
 Xenophonia
 Facebook
 Europe Jazz Network

Annual events in Bosnia and Herzegovina
Autumn events in Bosnia and Herzegovina
Festivals in Sarajevo
Jazz festivals in Bosnia and Herzegovina
Tourist attractions in Sarajevo